The 2003–04 British National League season was the eighth season of the British National League, the second level of ice hockey in Great Britain. Seven teams participated in the league, and the Guildford Flames won the championship.

Regular season

Playoffs

First round

Semifinals 
 Guildford Flames - Edinburgh Capitals 6:2, 4:3
 Bracknell Bees - Fife Flyers 2:1, 3:2

Final 
 Guildford Flames - Bracknell Bees 5:4, 4:3

External links 
 Season on hockeyarchives.info

British National League (1996–2005) seasons
United
2003–04 in British ice hockey